Alexander Hahn (born 1954) is an artist working with electronic media. An artistic innovator in his field, he integrates the time-based form of video with practices of computer imagery and print, animation, virtual reality, installation, and writing. He addresses the electronic image as a technological metaphor for perception, memory and dream: signals oscillate between lighting up and blanking out, between sensory presence, mental apparition and oblivion. As art historian Dominique Radrizzani writes in the catalog Astral Memories of a Flying Man: "It is this luminous realm of dream that Hahn’s great art of light and shadow rediscovers, using video like those infinite eyes which night has opened in us (Novalis) ... The terrains explored by Hahn are not those of the terrestrial globe anymore, but rather those of the ocular globe, the inward looking hemisphere of the eye."

Life 
Hahn was born in Zurich and grew up in Rapperswil-Jona, Switzerland. Introduced to computers while at the gymnasium Kantonsschule Zürcher Oberland in Wetzikon (1966–1973), he created a game of snakes and ladders in the APL (programming language). During his studies in Visual arts education at the Zurich University of the Arts (Bachelor in 1979), he made his first videos and Super8 films, e.g. «Flight and Glass» (1976)  or the Mockumentary «Demis» (1977) about the singer Demis Roussos. In 1981, he moved to New York and participated in the Whitney Museum Independent Study Program (ISP).

In 1990, he spent nine months in Rome as a fellow of the Istituto Svizzero. Between 1991 and 1994, he lived in Berlin, first as a fellow of the DAAD, the German Academic Exchange Service, then as Artist-in-residence at ART+COM. From 1995 to 1997, he lived in Warsaw. Today, Hahn lives and works in the Lower East Side of New York City and in Zurich.

Work 
In her analysis "Miniature and Series: The Re-invention of the Epistolary Form in the Work of Alexander Hahn", Cathie Payne writes that his "method of engaging with the very small, the fleeting, and the momentary, is part of an intimate, deeply personal and reflexive practice that offers a way to reproach the world through this change of scale - a world in miniature - and to reflect on this strangeness, vastness and beauty of what is found within the context of accelerated urban density and a changing anthropogenic worldview."
Since his first exhibition at the Lucerne Gallery Apropos in 1978, Hahn showed his work worldwide in over 20 solo exhibitions and in over 100 group shows and video festivals. In 2007, the Kunstmuseum Solothurn and Museum der Moderne Salzburg organized a retrospective about his work. The San Francisco Museum of Modern Art showed his interactive work "Luminous Point" in 2008 in the bi-personal show "Room for Thought - Alexander Hahn and Yves Netzhammer."

References

1954 births
Living people
Swiss artists
Zurich University of the Arts alumni
Artists from New York City
People from Rapperswil-Jona
Video art